Bomb Scared is a 2017 Spanish black comedy film about four Basque ETA terrorists who are planning a terrorist attack in Spain. The film was released worldwide on October 12, 2017, by Netflix.

Synopsis
Four Basque ETA terrorists, living together with peculiar Spanish neighbors, are planning a terrorist attack in Spain, but await a phone call with instructions from the head of the organization. It takes place in the summer of 2010 in a small Spanish town, when at the same time the Spain national football team wins the World Cup in South Africa and the whole country celebrating.

Cast
 Javier Cámara as Martín
 Julián López as Pernando
 Miren Ibarguren as Ainara
 Gorka Otxoa as Álex
 Ramón Barea as Artexte
 Luis Bermejo as Armando
 Josean Bengoetxea as Benito
 Ane Gabarain as Beitia
 Tina Sáinz as Lourdes
 Bárbara Santa-Cruz as Natalia

Informational notes

References

External links
 
 
 

2017 films
2010s Spanish-language films
Spanish black comedy films
Spanish-language Netflix original films
2017 black comedy films
Films about terrorism in Europe
Films set in Spain
Films set in 2010
Films about ETA (separatist group)